The 2018–19 Grambling State Tigers men's basketball team represents Grambling State University during the 2018–19 NCAA Division I men's basketball season. The Tigers, led by second-year head coach Donte Jackson, play their home games at the Fredrick C. Hobdy Assembly Center in Grambling, Louisiana as members of the Southwestern Athletic Conference.

Previous season
The Tigers finished the 2017–18 season 17–14, 13–5 in SWAC play. However, the Tigers were ineligible for postseason play due to APR violations.

Roster

Schedule and results

|-
!colspan=9 style=|Non-conference regular season

 
 
 
 
 
 
 
 
 
 
 

|-
!colspan=9 style=| SWAC regular season

|-
!colspan=9 style="background:#000000; color:#FFD700;"| SWAC tournament

|-
!colspan=9 style="background:#000000; color:#FFD700;"|CollegeInsider.com Postseason tournament
|-

References

Grambling State Tigers men's basketball seasons
Grambling State
Gramb
Gramb
Grambling State